Frederick Spencer (1871–1959) was an English footballer who played in the Football League for Nottingham Forest and Notts County.

References

1871 births
1959 deaths
English footballers
Association football forwards
English Football League players
Nottingham Forest F.C. players
Notts County F.C. players